The individual show jumping in equestrian at the 1948 Summer Olympics in London was held at the Wembley Stadium on 14 August. The competition consisted of a single round of jumping. In the case of a tie in points, a jump-off was arranged. The jump-off had no time limit, however, the time taken to complete the jump-off was used as a tie-breaker. The points from the individual competition were also used in the team competition. There were 44 competitors from 15 nations, with nations able to send up to three riders each. The event was won by Humberto Mariles of Mexico, with his teammate Rubén Uriza taking silver at the top of a three-way jump-off for second place. Mariles' win was Mexico's first victory in the event. Jean-François d'Orgeix of France earned that nation's first individual jumping medal since 1928 with his bronze.

Background

This was the eighth appearance of the event, which had first been held at the 1900 Summer Olympics and has been held at every Summer Olympics at which equestrian sports have been featured (that is, excluding 1896, 1904, and 1908). It is the oldest event on the current programme, the only one that was held in 1900.

None of the top 10 riders from the pre-war 1936 competition returned. 

Brazil, Denmark, Finland, and Ireland each made their debut in the event. France and Sweden both competed for the seventh time, tied for the most of any nation; Sweden had missed only the inaugural 1900 competition, while France missed the individual jumping in 1932.

Competition format

The team and individual jumping competitions used the same scores. A single round of jumping was held.

The jumping test featured 16 obstacles (19 total jumps) over 870 metres. Points were lost for faults (including elimination for the third refusal on the course) and for exceeding the time limit. Ties for medals were determined by jump-off; other ties were not broken. In the jump-off, there was no time limit but instead the time was used as a tie-breaker if pairs had the same number of faults.

Schedule

All times are British Summer Time (UTC+1)

Results

Mariles was the last rider. Three riders had already finished with 8 faults apiece. Only two teams (Spain and Great Britain) had finished; with Mariles' teammates both having completed the course, he needed only finish the course to earn a team bronze. A score under 39 would earn team silver for Mexico; under 28.50, team gold. Those marks would turn out to be well more than Mariles needed; he had the best run of anyone with only 4 jumping penalties (knocking down the 15th jump) and an over-time penalty of 2.25, for a total of 6.25 penalties and the gold medal.

 Silver medal jump-off

References

Equestrian at the Summer Olympics